Ragnwi Marcelind (1953-2021) was a Swedish Christian Democratic politician. She was a member of the Riksdag from 1998 to 2006. From 2006 she was the State Secretary for Maria Larsson, the Minister of Elder Care and Public Health.

External links
Ragnwi Marcelind at the Riksdag website
Ragnwi Marcelind official page

Members of the Riksdag from the Christian Democrats (Sweden)
1953 births
Women members of the Riksdag
Members of the Riksdag 2002–2006
21st-century Swedish women politicians
Members of the Riksdag 1998–2002
2021 deaths